Lokomotiv Stadium (Perovo) is a multi-use stadium in Moscow, Russia. It is currently used mostly for football matches and is the home ground of Lokomotiv-2 Moscow. Presently the stadium holds 500 people, all seated. Its surface is an artificial pitch. The situated is situated a few metres away from the Perovo Metro.

Sports venues in Moscow
Football venues in Russia
FC Lokomotiv Moscow